Eliot Matazo (born 15 February 2002) is a Belgian professional footballer who plays as a midfielder for AS Monaco.

Club career 
Matazo made his professional debut for AS Monaco on 27 September 2020 in a Ligue 1 game against RC Strasbourg. On 9 May 2021, he scored his first Ligue 1 goal in a 1–0 away win over Reims.

Personal life 
His mother is of Luo descent in Kenya.

Career statistics

Club

References

External links
 Profile at the AS Monaco FC website
 
 

2002 births
Living people
Belgian footballers
Belgium youth international footballers
Belgian people of Kenyan descent
Belgian sportspeople of African descent
Belgian people of Democratic Republic of the Congo descent
Association football midfielders
People from Woluwe-Saint-Lambert
AS Monaco FC players
Ligue 1 players
Championnat National 2 players
Belgian expatriate sportspeople in Monaco
Belgian expatriate footballers
Expatriate footballers in Monaco
Footballers from Brussels